Daniel Jay Gokey (born April 24, 1980) is an American singer and former church music director. He was the third-place finalist on the eighth season of American Idol. After his placing on the show, Gokey signed to 19 Recordings and RCA Nashville at the beginning of a career in country music, releasing the single "My Best Days Are Ahead of Me.” His debut album, My Best Days, was released in March 2010.
 
After leaving RCA Nashville in November 2011, he gravitated his music towards an adult pop/contemporary Christian sound and subsequently made a record/publishing deal with BMG in May 2013. Since the release of My Best Days, he has released 6 other studio albums, including Hope in Front of Me, Rise, and Jesus People.

Early life
Gokey started singing with his family in church, but stated he would rather record mainstream music than perform solely Christian/gospel music. He was the worship director at his church in Milwaukee, Faith Builders International Ministries, for several years.

He is the fifth of six children.  He has a brother named Charles, and four sisters: Angela, Janell, Gina, and Tracey.

He has acknowledged the influence of Jeffrey and Robin Pruitt, who are the pastors of the church where he worked, and also Matthew Barnett, the founder of the LA Dream Center.  He has stated that his faith is the "key to who I am". Gokey was a church music director, while also driving a semi truck (18 wheeler) for a local logistics company for two years.

American Idol

Overview
Gokey rose to national fame with his participation in the eighth season of American Idol. Gokey's American Idol audition occurred only four weeks after his wife's death in July 2008.

During Rock Week (Top 4 week), Gokey's take on Aerosmith's "Dream On" was planned for the extended scream with which he finished the song. Gokey was the only contestant in that season who was never in the bottom two or three, but he was eliminated in third place on May 13, 2009, after his performance of Joe Cocker's "You Are So Beautiful."

During the season 8 finale on May 20, 2009, Gokey performed a duet with R&B superstar Lionel Richie. The performance opened with Gokey singing a true-to-the-original soulful ballad solo of Richie's "Hello," and then Richie joined Gokey for a duet of his hits "Just Go" and "All Night Long".

Performances/results 

 Due to the judges using their one save to save Matt Giraud, the Top 7 remained intact for another week.
 It was only announced that Allison Iraheta received the lowest number of votes this week. The other member(s) of the bottom two or three were never revealed.

Post-Idol career

Gokey was nominated in his home state of Wisconsin for a WAMI (Wisconsin Area Music Industry) Award for Best Christian/Gospel Artist of the Year.

As of September 2009, Gokey finished his tour with the other idols on the American Idols LIVE! Tour 2009, and he worked on his foundation, Sophia's Heart, which was set up to help disadvantaged children.

Gokey, known for his many pairs of eyeglasses that he often wore on the show, had stated he might start an eyewear line to help raise funds for his foundation and Match Eyewear teamed with him for the Danny Gokey Eyewear collection. Launched in March 2012, the collection has exceeded sales projections with over 1.7 million in net retail sales.

2009–2010: My Best Days
On September 1, 2009, Gokey signed with 19 Recordings/RCA Nashville, becoming the first third-place finisher to record with 19 and the first male Idol to be signed to a major country label. On November 19, 2009, 19 Recordings and RCA Records announced the release of the debut single "My Best Days Are Ahead of Me". Gokey's debut album, My Best Days, was released on March 2, 2010. It debuted on the Billboard charts at number four, and it netted Gokey the best opening-week sales by a debut country male in 18 years and the highest debut of digital downloads sold by any new country artist ever. In support of the album, Gokey was the opening act on Sugarland's Incredible Machine tour which began in April. Gokey also performed at country singer Darryl Worley's ninth annual Tennessee River Run festival in Savannah, Tennessee along with other artists such as Joe Diffie and Lee Brice. The event helped raise $200,000 for the Darryl Worley Foundation.

On October 18, 2010, Gokey earned a nomination for Best New/Breakthrough Artist at the first annual American Country Awards. On November 21, 2010, Gokey was a part of ABC's pre-show event at the American Music Awards.

2011–2013: Love Again and label change
Gokey released the single "Second Hand Heart" penned by Cary Barlowe, Shane Stevens and Josh Kear on July 4, 2011. He was one of opening acts on Taylor Swift's Speak Now World Tour. He also made an appearance in a TV movie with Candace Cameron Bure called Truth Be Told.

Gokey left RCA Nashville in November 2011.

Gokey released his EP Love Again in May 2012. It was self-released limitedly via his official website only as physical CD format. His memoir, Hope in Front of Me: Find Purpose in Your Darkest Moments, was published on October 1, 2013.

2014–2018:  Hope in Front of Me, Christmas Is Here and Rise

Gokey kicked off 2014 with the release of his new single "Hope in Front of Me" under BMG.

Gokey's second album, Hope in Front of Me, was released on June 23 and debuted at number one on the Billboard  Christian Albums chart.

In late August, "Hope in Front of Me" topped both the Billboard Christian Airplay chart (lasted 3 weeks) and Mediabase Christian Adult Contemporary chart.
For the week ending of September 20, it also topped the Billboard Christian AC Songs chart.

On December 5, the official lyric video for the second single "More Than You Think I Am" was released.

In the spring of 2015, Gokey joined Natalie Grant's Burn Bright tour as a special guest, followed by The Bible Tour 2015 with Steven Curtis Chapman, Brandon Heath and Francesca Battistelli.

"Hope in Front of Me" was nominated for Song of the Year at K-LOVE Fan Awards 2015, held on May 31 and one of award-winning songs at 2015 BMI Christian Awards, held on June 23.

In July, "More Than You Think I Am" peaked at No. 6 on the Billboard Christian Airplay chart.
In August, Gokey earned nominations for New Artist of the Year and Song of the Year for "Hope in Front of Me" at 46th GMA Dove Awards.

On September 25, Gokey released the lead single "Lift Up Your Eyes" from his holiday album, Christmas Is Here, which was released on October 16. In October, Gokey joined NewSong's Beating Hearts Tour with Mandisa. In December, Gokey joined the 2015 K-LOVE Christmas Tour as a special guest.

Rise was released on January 13, 2017. Rise performed well commercially on the charts and on the sucess for some of its songs and received multiple award nominations, including the Grammy Awards.

2019-present: Haven't Seen It Yet and Jesus People

Gokey released "Haven't Seen It Yet" as a single, which has been a huge commercial success, reaching the top three on the Billboard Christian charts and number four in Cross Rhythms. His sixth album, Haven't Seen It Yet, was released on April 19, 2019. The album peaked at number two on the Billboard Top Christian Albums chart and number one at Christian Airplay chart. The releases were nominated for two Grammy Award categories and the song was the winner of a Dove Award for Short Form Music Video Of The Year. He also released radio and Spanish versions of some of the songs on the album in 2020.

Later, Gokey's eighth album, Jesus People, was released on August 20, 2022, which he experimented with singing with various genres, such as Latin pop, classical music and dance-pop. The album peaked at number 1 on the Billboard Top Christian Albums chart and at number 99 on the Billboard 200 chart, and managed to be successful in digital streams. The album consists of five singles that achieved commercial records, which were "We All Need Jesus", "Stand in Faith", "He Believes in You", "Agradecido" and "Do For Love". In the first week of August, Gokey released the "Stand In Faith" and "Do For Love" music videos. He also toured extensively and appears in Stand Together Tour with Mac Powell and Newsboys.

Personal life
Gokey is a Christian. He married his high school sweetheart, Sophia Martinez, on May 15, 2004. The two had been together since 1997.

On July 9, 2008, four weeks before he auditioned for American Idol, Gokey's wife died from complications during her third surgery to treat her congenital heart disease. The couple had been together for 12 years, and Gokey credited her for his success. Sophia was a fan of American Idol and encouraged Gokey to be a contestant, and Danny started a foundation in her name, Sophia's Heart Foundation, with some of her family members who are also musicians. With branches in Milwaukee, Nashville, and Sacramento, the organization's goals are to provide hope and help to homeless families, provide scholarships to deserving students and operate a thriving inner-city music and arts program.

In 2011, Gokey began dating Leyicet Peralta. The two announced their engagement on December 25, 2011, on the Sophia's Heart website. They were married on January 29, 2012. Their son Daniel Emanuel was born on January 20, 2013. Their daughter Victoria Isabella was born on November 28, 2014. Their son Gabriel Daniel was born on August 29, 2017. On August 16, 2019, their fourth child,  Emmanuel, was born on the birthday of Danny's first wife.

Politics 
Gokey was raised in a Republican household and has publicly supported Republican politicians since 2012. He supported Donald Trump during his first impeachment trial and in the 2020 presidential election. In January 2022, Gokey appeared at the event announcing Doug Mastriano's entry into the Pennsylvania gubernatorial race.

Awards and nominations

Discography

 My Best Days (2010)
 Hope in Front of Me (2014)
 Christmas Is Here (2015) 
 La Esperanza Frente a Mi (2016)
 Rise (2017)
 Haven't Seen It Yet (2019)
 The Greatest Gift: A Christmas Collection (2019)
 Jesus People (2021)

References

External links

 
 Sophia's Heart Foundation (Official charity website)

1980 births
19 Recordings artists
21st-century American singers
American country singer-songwriters
American Idol participants
American male singer-songwriters
American performers of Christian music
American Protestants
Living people
Musicians from Milwaukee
RCA Records Nashville artists
Spanish-language singers of the United States
Christians from Wisconsin
21st-century American male singers
Singer-songwriters from Wisconsin